Verderber is a surname. Notable people with the surname include:

Chuck Verderber (born 1959), American basketball player
Richard Verderber (1884–1955), Austrian fencer